Orfeu is an album by bassist Ron Carter recorded in 1999 and originally released on the Japanese Somethin' Else label with a US release on Blue Note Records.

Reception

The AllMusic review by David R. Adler said "This record could have been merely one more Latin-themed album by an American jazz musician. But creative production choices and fantastic musicianship make it artistically solid and uncommonly beautiful". In JazzTimes, Owen Cordle stated "The group mixes the melodic side of jazz improvisation with the subtle insinuation of the various supporting rhythms ...This is one of his better albums as a leader". On All About Jazz, Jim Santella wrote "Highly recommended, Ron Carter's Orfeu combines mainstream jazz with lyrical Brazilian charm for an outstanding session".

Track listing 
All compositions by Ron Carter except where noted
 "Saudade" – 6:34
 "Manhã de Carnaval" (Luiz Bonfá, Antônio Maria) – 5:57
 "Por-Do-Sol" – 5:17
 "Goin' Home" (Antonin Dvorák, Carter) – 7:27
 "117 Special" – 6:53
 "Obrigado" – 5:34
 "Samba de Orfeu" (Bonfá, Maria) – 7:36

Personnel 
Ron Carter – bass 
Houston Person – tenor saxophone
Stephen Scott – piano
Bill Frisell – guitar
Payton Crossley – drums
Steve Kroon – percussion

References 

Ron Carter albums
1999 albums
Blue Note Records albums